Aphanotorulus ammophilus, also known as the black spotted pleco or L094, is a species of benthopelagic tropical freshwater catfish in the family Loricariidae endemic to Venezuela, specifically the Río Orinoco drainage. Due to an initial erroneous publication, A. ammophilus was initially placed into Hypostomus instead of Aphanotorulus. However, because this species shows sexual dimorphism, has a relatively flatter shape, and has a jagged posterior edge of its oral disc, it was placed in the genus Aphanotorulus. A. ammophilus reaches 16.1 cm (6.3 inches) SL.

References

Loricariidae
Fish of South America
Taxa named by Jonathan W. Armbruster
Fish described in 1996